The so-called Saardom (full name: "Ecclesia Parochialis Catholica Sacratissimi Sacramenti Dioecesis Treverensis", "Catholic Parish Church of the Blessed Sacrament in the Diocese of Trier") in Dillingen/Saar is one of the largest sacred buildings in Saarland. It is the parish church of the parish of St Sacrament. The parish belongs to the parish community of the Holy Sacrament, St John the Baptist in Dillingen, St Joseph and St Wendelin in Diefflen, St Maximin in Pachten, and St Mary consolation of the saddeneds (Consolatrix afflictorum) on the Pachtener Heide. The church belongs to the Roman Catholic Diocese of Trier. The feast of dedication is the Solemnity of the Most Holy Body and Blood of Christ.

The church was built between 1910 and 1913 according to plans by the Trier church-architect Peter Marx (1871-1958), mainly in the Neo-Romanesque style. The prototypes of the Saardom include the towers of the Bamberg Cathedral, the towers of the cathedrals of Laon and Naumburg, and the facade of the Cathedral of Metz.

Dimensions

The Saardom has the following dimensions:
 External length (with porch): 62.30 m
 Largest external width in the transept area: 33.50 m
 Outer main-facade width: 23.50 m
 Height of the crossing tower: 33.00 m
 Height of the eastern tower with tower cross: 48,50 m
 Height of the western tower with tower cross: 50.00 m
 Inner width of the central nave: 10 m
 Inner height of aisles: 6 m
 Inner height of the central nave: 15 m
 Inner height of the dome: 27 m
 Inner height of the Lady Chapel and the Christ the King-Chapel: 8 m
 Internal height of the choral passage: 7.40 m
 Intercolumniation of the arcades between middle and aisle: 3.50 m
 Intercolumniation of the apsea arcades: 2 m

Comparing the Saardom with the largest churches in Saarland, the St Michael's Church in Saarbrücken measures 60 m in the outer length and 34.60 m in the largest outer width. The Saardom and the St Michael's Church are in the length surpassed by the neo-Gothic St Josef´s Church in Saarbrücken-Malstatt with 68 m outer length.

History

First World War
As early as the First World War in 1917, four out of five bronze bells were melted down for armament purposes. Seven years later, in 1924, four cast steel bells were replaced, which still can be heard today.

Second World War
The explosion of an ammunition train at the Dillingen (Saar) station in 1944 as a consequence of an air raid in World War II caused severe damage. A German tank, which was standing next to the Saardom, attracted American fire, which caused additional damage to the church: Vaults had partially collapsed, stones broken out, windows burst by explosion blasts. Grenades had torn large gaps in the front entrance. The vestibule with the figurine frieze and the crowning crucifixion group, the large rose window and the overlying arcade with the final triangular pediment were shot to pieces.

Reconstruction
After the end of the fighting in March 1945, they began immediately to clear and repair the damages of Saardom. The end of the restoration of the church was celebrated at Easter 1953.

Further reading
 H. Brunner, H. Caspary, A. v. Reitzenstein, F. Stich: Rheinland-Pfalz / Saarland, Kunstdenkmäler und Museen. Reclams Kunstführer Deutschland, Bd. 6, 8. Auflage, Stuttgart 1990, S. 91.
 H. P. Buchleitner: Kultureller Wiederaufbau im Saarland 1945–1955 - Ein Text- und Bildwerk. Band 1, Saarbrücken 1955, S. 62, 65.
 Georg Dehio: Handbuch der deutschen Kunstdenkmäler - Rheinland-Pfalz / Saarland. 2. Auflage, München/Berlin 1984, S. 213.
 Oranna Dimmig, Michaela Mazurkiewicz-Wonn: 	Kunstort der Saardom: die katholische Pfarrkirche Heilig Sakrament in Dillingen/Saar (Reihe Kunstlexikon Saar, Herausgeber Jo Enzweiler), Saarbrücken 2012, .
 Jens Fachbach, Georg Schelbert, Mario Simmer: Zum 50. Todestag des Architekten Peter Marx. In: Neues Trierisches Jahrbuch 48, 2008, S. 257–264.
 Handbuch des Bistums Trier, 20. Ausgabe, Trier 1952, S. 279.
 Katholisches Bildungswerk Dillingen-Nalbach e. V. (Hrsg.): 100 Jahre Saardom, Heilig Sakrament Dillingen, 1000 Jahre Pfarrei Dillingen. Festschrift zum Jubiläum der Kirchenkonsekration am 25. April 2013, Dillingen 2012.
 Kath. Pfarramt Hl. Sakrament Dillingen (Hrsg.): Hl. Sakrament Dillingen/Saar, Kirchenchronik anläßlich des 50. Jahrestages der Konsekration der katholischen Pfarrkirche Hl. Sakrament Dillingen/Saar am 17. November 1963. Dillingen 1963.
 Manfred Kostka: Katholische Pfarrkirche Hl. Sakrament Saardom Dillingen/Saar. Dillingen/Saar 1987.
 Manfred Kostka: Peter Marx, ein Trierer Kirchenbaumeister zwischen Historismus und Moderne. Wissenschaftliche Arbeit zur Erlangung des Diploms in Theologie an der Theologischen Fakultät Trier, Trier 1989.
 Manfred Kostka: Katholische Pfarrkirche Hl. Sakrament "Saardom". 2. erweiterte und verbesserte Auflage, Dillingen/Saar 1997.
 Kunstverein Dillingen im Alten Schloss, Dillingen/Saar (Hrsg.): Kunstführer Dillingen/Saar. Dillingen/Saar 1999, S. 18–19.
 Aloys Lehnert: Geschichte der Stadt Dillingen/Saar. Dillingen/Saar 1968.
 Kristine Marschall: Sakralbauwerke des Klassizismus und des Historismus im Saarland. (=Veröffentlichungen des Instituts für Landeskunde im Saarland, Band 40), Saarbrücken 2002, .
 Erwin Ney: Die Weihnachtskrippe im Saardom Heilig Sakrament Dillingen/Saar – Gestern und Heute. Hrsg. vom Pfarramt Hl. Sakrament, Dillingen, Saarlouis o. J. (1999).
 Matthias Prior: Die neue Kirche in Dillingen/Saar, ihre Vorbereitung und Vollendung. Trier 1913.
 Franz Ronig: Der Kirchenbau des 19. Jahrhunderts im Bistum Trier. In: Kunst des 19. Jahrhunderts im Rheinland, Band 1, Düsseldorf 1980, S. 263 f.
 L. Sudbrack u. A. Jakob (Hrsg.): Das katholische Saarland, Heimat und Kirche. Saarbrücken 1954–1956, II/III, 1954, S. 27 f.
 Walter Zimmermann (Bearb.): Die Kunstdenkmäler der Kreise Ottweiler und Saarlouis. 2. Auflage, Saarbrücken 1976, S. 176 f.
 1000 Jahre Pfarrei Dillingen, 75 Jahre Saardom Heilig Sakrament. In: Saarbrücker Zeitung Nr. 304, Ausgabe Saarlouis, 31. Dezember 1988.
 Günter Maas – Fassade des Saar-Doms ist fertiggestellt, Günter Maas schuf die Hochreliefs an der Kirche Heilig-Sakrament in Dillingen. In: Saarbrücker Zeitung, Juli 1953.

References

Churches in Saarland
Roman Catholic churches in Germany
Romanesque Revival church buildings in Germany
Church buildings with domes
Eclectic architecture